The Caima is a river in Portugal. Its source is in Arouca Municipality.

Rivers of Portugal